The Curlew Mountains are a range of low-lying hills situated between Boyle and Castlebaldwin in northeastern Connacht.

Toponymy

Geography
Geologically, the Curlew Mountains are made of Devonian sandstone and conglomerate that is harder than the surrounding Carboniferous limestone, hence their appearance as an upland feature.

History
The Battle of Curlew Pass, in which Irish forces led by Red Hugh O'Donnell defeated an English army of about 2000 was fought here on 15 August 1599.

References

 
   
 
 

Mountains and hills of County Sligo
Mountains and hills of County Roscommon